Dafni (both deriving from the Greek word for "laurel") may refer to:

Greek places
Dafni, Achaea, part of the municipal unit of Paion, Achaea
Dafni, Aetolia-Acarnania, part of the municipal unit of Naupactus, Aetolia-Acarnania
Dafni, Arcadia, part of the municipal unit of Valtetsi, Arcadia
Dafni, Mount Athos
in Attica:
Dafni, Attica, a municipal unit and a suburb of Athens
 Dafni BC is also the name of a Division A2 professional basketball club located therein 
Dafni, Chaidari is a quarter of Chaidari 
 Dafni also refers to the Daphni Monastery, located here
Dafni, Boeotia, part of the municipal unit of Dervenochori, Boeotia
Dafni, Corfu, part of the municipal unit of Agios Georgios, Corfu
Dafni, Corinthia, part of the municipality of Nemea, Corinthia
in Elis:
Dafni, Amaliada, part of the municipal unit of Amaliada
Dafni, Vouprasia, part of the municipal unit of Vouprasia
Dafni, Evrytania, part of the municipal unit of Viniani, Evrytania
Dafni, Kozani, part of the municipal unit of Tsotyli, Kozani regional unit
Dafni, Laconia, part of the municipal unit of Faris, Laconia
Dafni, Lemnos, part of the municipal unit of Atsiki, Lemnos island
Dafni, Pella, part of the municipality of Skydra, Pella regional unit
Dafni, Phthiotis, part of the municipal unit of Ypati, Phthiotis
Dafni, Icaria, part of the municipal unit of Evdilos, Icaria island
Dafni, Serres, part of the municipal unit of Achinos, Serres regional unit
Dafni, Xanthi, a village in Xanthi regional unit

People
Daphni (musician), one of the stage names of the musician Daniel Snaith
Dafni Bokota (born 1960), greek singer and presenter

See also
Dafne (disambiguation)
Daphne (disambiguation)